SC Rusj Užhorod or SC Rusz Ungvár (Cyrillic: Русь Ужгород) is a former Czechoslovak and Hungarian club that was created in 1925–26 out of Magyar AC (1908). Ukrainian club Hoverla Uzhhorod later traced its heritage from this club indicating 1925 on its club's crest as the year of its foundation.

Brief overview

The club was established on August 15, 1925. The colors of the club were chosen red and green, while the club's crest was the Coat of arms of Carpatho-Ukraine. 

Its first game it played on June 4, 1926 against another club from Uzhhorod, ČsŠK Užhorod, and lost it 0:2. On May 31 and June 1, 1927 the club traveled to Lwów, Poland where it played against another local Ukrainian club Ukraina Lwów tying both games 3:3.

From 1929 the club participated in regional championships of Slovakia (1928 to 1934 as Eastern Slovakia and Carpatho-Ruthenia). It became a champion of Slovakia in 1933 and 1936. In 1933 Rusj Uzhorod lost a qualification play-off to DFC Prag (1:3, 1:4) to qualify for the Czechoslovak First League. Becoming the 1936 champion of Slovakia allowed Rus Uzhhorod to enter the 1936–37 Czechoslovak First League for a season. It was eliminated from it for the next season. During the World War II Rusj competed in the second football division of Hungary (Nemzeti Bajnokság II). After the war the club was formally dissolved, while many former players joined the football regional team of Zakarpattia for the Soviet Spartakiad competition.

The regional Zakarpattia team won the Soviet competition and was transformed into Spartak Uzhgorod which included players from all former clubs in the region.

Among the notable club's coaches there was Otto Mazal-Skvajn who during the World War II coached Wisla Krakow (1939–46). Among the notable club's players there was a Czechoslovakian goalkeeper of Ukrainian (Ruthenian) origin Alexa Boksay (1911–2007).

League history

Czechoslovakia
{|class="wikitable"
|-bgcolor="#efefef"
! Season
! Div.
! Pos.
! Pl.
! W
! D
! L
! GS
! GA
! P
!Domestic Cup
!colspan=2|Europe
!Notes
|-bgcolor=LightCyan
|align=center|1928–29
|align=center|2nd
|align=center bgcolor=gold|1
|align=center|
|align=center|
|align=center|
|align=center|
|align=center|
|align=center|
|align=center|?
|align=center|
|align=center|
|align=center|
|align=center|
|-bgcolor=LightCyan
|align=center|1929–30
|align=center|2nd
|align=center bgcolor=silver|2
|align=center|
|align=center|
|align=center|
|align=center|
|align=center|
|align=center|
|align=center|?
|align=center|
|align=center|
|align=center|
|align=center|
|-bgcolor=LightCyan
|align=center|1930–31
|align=center|2nd
|align=center bgcolor=silver|2
|align=center|
|align=center|
|align=center|
|align=center|
|align=center|
|align=center|
|align=center|?
|align=center|
|align=center|
|align=center|
|align=center|
|-bgcolor=LightCyan
|align=center|1931–32
|align=center|2nd
|align=center bgcolor=silver|2
|align=center|
|align=center|
|align=center|
|align=center|
|align=center|
|align=center|
|align=center|?
|align=center|
|align=center|
|align=center|
|align=center|
|-bgcolor=LightCyan
|align=center|1932–33
|align=center|2nd
|align=center bgcolor=gold|1
|align=center|
|align=center|
|align=center|
|align=center|
|align=center|
|align=center|
|align=center|?
|align=center|
|align=center|
|align=center|
|align=center|lost promotion playoff
|-bgcolor=LightCyan
|align=center|1933–34
|align=center|2nd
|align=center bgcolor=silver|2
|align=center|
|align=center|
|align=center|
|align=center|
|align=center|
|align=center|
|align=center|?
|align=center|
|align=center|
|align=center|
|align=center|
|-bgcolor=LightCyan
|align=center|1934–35
|align=center|2nd
|align=center bgcolor=silver|2
|align=center|
|align=center|
|align=center|
|align=center|
|align=center|
|align=center|
|align=center|?
|align=center|
|align=center|
|align=center|
|align=center|lost promotion playoff
|-bgcolor=LightCyan
|align=center|1935–36
|align=center|2nd
|align=center bgcolor=gold|1
|align=center|8
|align=center|4
|align=center|2
|align=center|2
|align=center|23
|align=center|13
|align=center|10
|align=center|
|align=center|
|align=center|
|align=center bgcolor=green|Promoted
|-
|align=center|1936–37
|align=center|1st
|align=center|11
|align=center|22
|align=center|3
|align=center|2
|align=center|17
|align=center|24
|align=center|79
|align=center|8
|align=center|
|align=center|
|align=center|
|align=center bgcolor=red|Relegated
|-bgcolor=LightCyan
|align=center|1937–38
|align=center|2nd
|align=center|?
|align=center|
|align=center|
|align=center|
|align=center|
|align=center|
|align=center|
|align=center|?
|align=center|
|align=center|
|align=center|
|align=center|
|-
|align=center|1938–39
|align=center colspan=13|games suspended due to military conflict
|}

Kingdom of Hungary
{|class="wikitable"
|-bgcolor="#efefef"
! Season
! Div.
! Pos.
! Pl.
! W
! D
! L
! GS
! GA
! P
!Domestic Cup
!colspan=2|Europe
!Notes
|-bgcolor=LightCyan
|align=center|1939–40
|align=center|2nd "Highland"
|align=center|6
|align=center|30
|align=center|17
|align=center|2
|align=center|11
|align=center|68
|align=center|56
|align=center|36
|align=center|
|align=center|
|align=center|
|align=center|
|-bgcolor=LightCyan
|align=center|1940–41
|align=center|2nd "Tisa"
|align=center|9
|align=center|26
|align=center|11
|align=center|4
|align=center|11
|align=center|57
|align=center|53
|align=center|26
|align=center|
|align=center|
|align=center|
|align=center|
|-bgcolor=LightCyan
|align=center|1941–42
|align=center|2nd "Rákóczi"
|align=center|7
|align=center|26
|align=center|12
|align=center|3
|align=center|11
|align=center|51
|align=center|64
|align=center|27
|align=center|
|align=center|
|align=center|
|align=center|
|-bgcolor=LightCyan
|align=center|1942–43
|align=center|2nd "Rákóczi"
|align=center|7
|align=center|22
|align=center|8
|align=center|5
|align=center|9
|align=center|38
|align=center|39
|align=center|21
|align=center|
|align=center|
|align=center|
|align=center|
|-bgcolor=LightCyan
|align=center|1943–44
|align=center|2nd "North"
|align=center|4
|align=center|26
|align=center|13
|align=center|2
|align=center|11
|align=center|48
|align=center|40
|align=center|28
|align=center|
|align=center|
|align=center|
|align=center|
|-
|align=center|1944–45
|align=center colspan=13|games suspended due to military conflict
|}

Honors
Slovak championship (within Czechoslovakia)
 Winner: 1932–33
 Runner-up: 1928–29, 1933–34

East Slovakia and Ruthenia
 Winner: 1928–29, 1932–33, 1933–34

See also
 Football league system in Czechoslovakia

References

External links
 Rus Uzhhorod. UkrSoccerHistory.com.
 Rus Uzhhorod at Magyar Futball
 Interview of Alexa Boksay by Tomas Pilat. "Podkarpatska Rus". January 2006
 Interview of Alexa Boksay by Tomas Pilat. "Podkarpatska Rus". February 2006 (continuation)
 Zapotocky, V. Rusj Uzhorod in the Czechoslovakian League. "Podkarpatska Rus". April 2006
 Hadzheha, V., Selmensky, S. From history of the Mukacheve football club "Karpaty". "Sport Taim" (Zakarpattia online). November 24, 2010.
 Svet sportu. (www.svetsportu11.sk)
 List of Slovak champions. RSSSF.

Uzhorod, Rusj
Uzhorod, Rusj
Uzhorod, Rusj
Uzhorod, Rusj
Uzhorod, Rusj
Uzhorod, Rusj
Sport in Uzhhorod

pl:Ruś Użhorod